Leonard Stanley Monk (14 November 1873 – 21 July 1948) was a New Zealand cricketer. He played one first-class match for Otago in 1901/02.

Monk was a fast bowler of considerable pace. After one first-class match in December 1901 in which he secured four wickets cheaply, and Otago won, he left Dunedin to tour with the Hawtrey Comedy Company, which also fielded a cricket team on its tours. He remained in the theatre as an actor and manager, touring in Australia and New Zealand. He represented the Shakespearean actor Allan Wilkie in the 1920s.

Monk served with the Australian forces in World War One. He married Elsie Stephanie Austin in July 1934.

See also
 List of Otago representative cricketers

References

External links
 

1873 births
1948 deaths
New Zealand cricketers
Otago cricketers
Cricketers from Dunedin
Theatre managers and producers
Australian military personnel of World War I